Washer  most commonly refers to:

Washer (hardware), a thin usually disc-shaped plate with a hole in the middle typically used with a bolt or nut
Washing machine, for cleaning clothes

Washer  may also refer to:

Dishwasher, a machine for cleaning dishware, cookware and cutlery
Dishwasher (occupation), a person who cleans dishware, cookware and cutlery
Washer, a person with obsessive-compulsive disorder who washes her/his hands compulsively
Washer method, a mathematical formula for finding volume
Washer pitching, an outdoor game involving tossing discs at a target

People with the surname
Arthur Washer (1855–1910), New Zealand cricketer
Buck Washer (1882–1955), American baseball pitcher
Jean Washer (1894–1972), Belgian tennis player
Mal Washer (born 1945), Australian politician
Paul Washer (born 1961), American Christian preacher
Philippe Washer (1924–2015), Belgian tennis player and son of Jean Washer

See also
Wash (disambiguation)
Washing